Caesariensis may refer to:

 Flavia Caesariensis, one of the provinces of northern Roman Britain
 Mauretania Caesariensis, an ancient Roman province in North Africa
 Maxima Caesariensis, one of the provinces of southern Roman Britain
 Priscianus Caesariensis (6th century), Latin grammarian